The 1992–93 Cypriot Second Division was the 38th season of the Cypriot second-level football league. Omonia Aradippou won their 2nd title.

Format
Fourteen teams participated in the 1992–93 Cypriot Second Division. All teams played against each other twice, once at their home and once away. The team with the most points at the end of the season crowned champions. The first two teams were promoted to 1993–94 Cypriot First Division. The last two teams were relegated to the 1993–94 Cypriot Third Division.

The 3rd-placed team faced the 12th-placed team of the 1992–93 Cypriot First Division, in a two-legged relegation play-off for one spot in the 1993–94 Cypriot First Division. The 12th-placed team faced the 3rd-placed team of the 1992–93 Cypriot Third Division, in a two-legged relegation play-off for one spot in the 1993–94 Cypriot Second Division.

Changes from previous season
Teams promoted to 1992–93 Cypriot First Division
 Ethnikos Achna
 APOP Paphos

Teams relegated from 1991–92 Cypriot First Division
 Alki Larnaca
 Omonia Aradippou

Teams promoted from 1991–92 Cypriot Third Division
 PAEEK FC
 THOI Lakatamia

Teams relegated to 1992–93 Cypriot Third Division
 Othellos Athienou
 Apollon Lympion

League standings

Playoff

Promotion playoff
The 3rd-placed team, Alki Larnaca, faced the 12th-placed team of the 1992–93 Cypriot First Division, Evagoras Paphos, in a two-legged relegation play-off for one spot in the 1993–94 Cypriot First Division. Evagoras Paphos won both matches and secured their place in the 1993–94 Cypriot First Division.

Evagoras Paphos 1–0 Alki Larnaca
Alki Larnaca 0–2 Evagoras Paphos

Relegation playoff
The 12th-placed team, Onisilos Sotira, faced the 3rd-placed team of the 1992–93 Cypriot Third Division, Tsaggaris Peledriou, in a two-legged relegation play-off for one spot in the 1993–94 Cypriot Second Division. Onisilos won both matches and secured their place in the 1993–94 Cypriot Second Division.

Onisilos Sotira 3–0 Tsaggaris Peledriou
Tsaggaris Peledriou 0–2 Onisilos Sotira (The match abandoned at 0–2 and was awarded 0–2 to Onisilos)

See also
 Cypriot Second Division
 1992–93 Cypriot First Division
 1992–93 Cypriot Cup

Sources

Cypriot Second Division seasons
Cyprus
1992–93 in Cypriot football